Alev Alatlı (born 1944 in Menemen) is a Turkish columnist and bestselling novelist.

Early years
She was born 1944 in the town of Menemen in western Turkey to an officer's family. She spent her childhood in Japan, where her father was appointed as the Military attaché in the Embassy of Turkey and also as the Liaison officer of the Turkish Brigade in Korea to the United Nations.

Alev Alatlı attended the American School in Japan in Nakameguro, Meguro, Tokyo. After finishing high school there, her family returned to Turkey, and Alev studied economics at the Middle East Technical University in Ankara, from where she graduated in 1963 with a Bachelor of Science degree.

Following graduation, she married her classmate Alper Orhon, a Turkish Cypriot. She was granted a Fulbright Scholarship and her husband a scholarship from the Ford Foundation to conduct postgraduate study in the USA. Educated at Vanderbilt University in Nashville, Tennessee, she earned a Master of Arts in Development Economics and Econometrics.

By this time, she had started to think about the importance of formulas and figures in explaining the world, and decided to pursue studies in philosophy. Although she enrolled at Dartmouth College in New Hampshire for doctoral studies on philosophy of religion and philosophy of history she doesn't have a Ph.D. degree.

In 1974, Alatlı returned to Turkey. She jobbed a while as a lecturer at Istanbul University and later at the State Planning Organization (DPT) in Ankara in her capacity as an economist.

In the next five years after her return from the US, Alev Alatlı spent her time mainly in studying Islam. She was also involved in a psycholinguistic project of  the University of California, Berkeley on language learning patterns of Turkish children. She published a magazine titled "Bizim İngilizce" ) in co-operation with the newspaper Cumhuriyet for Turks based on native tongue and culture.

Career
In 1982, she quit her other activities to stay at home and to devote herself to writing. Her first book titled "Aydın Despotizmi..." (Despotism of the Intellectuals...) was a philosophical study.

Alatlı's next work and first novel "Yaseminler Tüter mi Hala?" (Jasmines Smells No More!) appeared in 1985. It was inspired by the true story of a Greek Cypriot woman. Born and christened at the Apostolos Andreas Monastery on the Karpas Peninsula of Cyprus, she dies in a tragic manner at 32 in Piraeus, Greece, after two marriages -one with a Muslim Turkish Cypriot, the other with an Orthodox Greek– and five children.

Alev Alatlı's next works were two translations into Turkish of books by Edward Said titled "Covering Islam" (Haberlerin Ağında Islam) and "The Question of Palestine" (Filistin’in Sorunu), for which she was awarded with an honorary medal by Yaser Arafat.

Her novella "İşkenceci" (The Torturer), published in 1987, served as a prelude to her next four novels Viva la Muerte! - Yaşasın Ölüm!) in 1992, ’Nuke’ Türkiye! (Nuke Turkey) in 1993, Valla, Kurda Yedirdin Beni! (You Sure Made Me Prey to the Wolves) in 1993 and O.K. Musti! Türkiye Tamamdır. (OK Mustafa, Turkey's Done!) in 1994.

The highly realistic novel "Kadere Karşı Koy A.Ş." (Format your Fate Formidably, Inc.), another best seller by Alatlı, followed in 1995.

Alev Alatlı's first poetry book "Eylül '98" (September 1998) came out in 1999.

She wrote two futuristic books, "Kabus" (The Nightmare) in 1999 and "Rüya" (The Dream) in 2000 comprised by "Schrödinger's Cat".

Alatlı's next novels  "Grace over Enlightenment", "World Sentry" and "Eyy Uhnem! Eyy Uhnem!" are the first three books of a four-volume work on Russia called "Gogol’un İzinde" (On the Footsteps of Gogol). She was awarded in 2006 with the prize "Mikhail Aleksandrovich Sholokhov 100 Year in Literature" for her third novel in the series.

Since 2002, she wrote bi-weekly a column in the conservative newspaper with a moderate Islamic worldview Zaman. In February 2008, an article of her on the women's Islamic headgear turban was not allowed to be published by the newspaper's editor-of-chief with the argument "our readers are not ready for that". A book published in 2003 under the title "Şimdi Değilse, Ne zaman?" (If not now, when?) brought out a collection of her articles appeared in the newspaper Zaman.

Books

Novels
Aydın Despotizmi..., Alfa Basım Yayım Dağıtım (1982)
Yaseminler Tüter mi Hala?, Everest Yayınları (1985)
İşkenceci (1987)
Viva la Muerte! - Yaşasın Ölüm! - Or'da Kimse Var mı? 1. Kitap, Everest Yayınları (1992)
’Nuke’ Türkiye!- Or'da Kimse Var mı? 2. Kitap, Everest Yayınları (1993)
Valla, Kurda Yedirdin Beni! - Or'da Kimse Var mı? 3. Kitap, Everest Yayınları (1993)
O.K. Musti! Türkiye Tamamdır. - Or'da Kimse Var mı? 4. Kitap, Alfa Basım Yayım Dağıtım (1994)
Kabus - Schrödinger'in Kedisi 1. Kitap, Everest Yayınları (1999)
Rüya - Schrödinger'in Kedisi 2. Kitap, Everest Yayınları (2000)
Aydınlanma Değil, Merhamet! - Gogol'ün İzinde 1. Kitap, Everest Yayınları (2004)
Dünya Nöbeti - Gogol'ün İzinde 2. Kitap, Everest Yayınları (2005)
 Eyy Uhnem! Eyy Uhnem! - Gogol'ün İzinde 3. Kitap, Everest Yayınları (2006)
 Hollywood'u Kapattığım Gün, Everest Yayınları (2009) 360 pp., 
 Aklın Yolu da Bir Değildir... , Destek Yayınları (2009) 176 pp., 
 Beyaz Türkler Küstüler -  Or'da Hâlâ Kimse Var mı? 5. Kitap, Everest Yayınları (2013) 460 pp.,

Non-fiction
 Şimdi Değilse, Ne zaman?, Zaman Kitap (2003) 268 pp., 
 'Hayır!' Diyebilmeli İnsan, Zaman Kitap (2005) 182 pp,

Poems
Eylül '98 (September 1998)

Translations
Haberlerin Ağında İslam (1985)
Filistin’in Sorunu (1986)
En Emin Yol "Akvem ül-Mesalik’li Marifat Ahval el-Memalik" Tunuslu Hayreddin Paşa (1986)

Theater plays
Kadere Karşı Koy A.Ş. (2002)

References

External links
Alatlı's official web page

20th-century Turkish women writers
20th-century Turkish writers
21st-century Turkish women writers
1944 births
People from Menemen
Middle East Technical University alumni
Vanderbilt University alumni
Dartmouth College alumni
Academic staff of Istanbul University
Turkish women economists
Turkish economists
Turkish columnists
Living people
American School in Japan alumni
Turkish women columnists